Talkatora Garden is a Mughal-era garden situated on the Mother Teresa Crescent (previously Willingdon Crescent) in New Delhi. In Mughal times, it used to be a tank and a swimming pool. The Marathas defeated the Mughals in the Battle of Delhi (1737) at this place. The garden is now more famous for the Talkatora Stadium. It attracts a large number of tourists.

Etymology

The Talkatora Stadium close to it, is also named after it. A tal (tank) situated at the west side of the garden, is surrounded by hilly ground (part of the Delhi ridge), forms a katora, bowl-shaped natural depression, which gives the place its name.
The number of tourists increases here especially in the spring season. Apart from various types of flowers, there is also a stadium, where games and events are held. Programs are also held here for children for certain times to get them interested in gardening. The park is open all days of the week.

History
There was a tal (tank) at the west side of the garden, surrounded by hilly ground forming a katora (bowl shaped natural depression). Although the pond disappeared long ago, there still exists at the northwestern end of the garden, a long wall and domed octagonal pavilions at the two ends. This was an embankment (bund) to hold back rain water flowing into that tank. The surrounding area was used as a camping ground by the Maratha army in 1736-37

Tourist places near Talkatora Garden
There are many tourist attractions which are very near to Talkatora Garden. such as Sacred Heart Cathedral, India Gate, Hanuman Mandir, Bangla Sahib Gurudwara, Rashtrapati Bhawan and Jantar Mantar.

General facts
 Also Known As - Talkatora Bagh
 Location - Mother Teresa Crescent Road, Near President's Estate, New Delhi
 Major Attraction - Talkatora Indoor Stadium
 Time to Visit - Open on all days
 Preferred Timings - 3.00 p.m.- 6.00 p.m.
 Entry Fee - Free to all.
 Photography Charges - no Photograph charges
 Nearest Railway Station - New Delhi Railway Station
 Nearest Metro Station - Rajiv Chowk
 Nearest International Airport - Indira Gandhi International Airport
 Time required for sightseeing - One Hour
 Significance - Talkatora Gardens gets its name from the large walled tank; the place is historic as it was the venue for the fight of 1737 when the Mughals were defeated by the Marathas.

See also

List of parks in Delhi

References

Mughal Empire
Parks in Delhi